The John Andrew Miller House is a stone house built by an early Kentucky settler in the eastern area of Scott County, Kentucky when it was still a part of Virginia. The house is located off of Paris Pike between the city of Georgetown and the town of Newtown.  The property was added to the U.S. National Register of Historic Places on November 9, 1977.

History
The central area of Kentucky was settled by frontiersmen that received land grants as payment for their military service. In the early days in Kentucky, the area was dangerous because the settlers were frequently attacked by Native Americans that used the land as a buffalo hunting ground.

William C. Graves bought the property from Tarleton's estate in 1833.

Architecture
The John Andrew Miller House was constructed with strong materials to provide protection from attacks by Native Americans that occurred in the frontier areas of Virginia. The rugged doors were made of "6 panels on the outside and bias batten on the inside".

See also
List of the oldest buildings in Kentucky

References

Houses completed in 1785
National Register of Historic Places in Scott County, Kentucky
Houses in Scott County, Kentucky
Houses on the National Register of Historic Places in Kentucky
1785 establishments in Virginia
Pre-statehood history of Kentucky